The 2017–18 UEFA Europa League was the 47th season of Europe's secondary club football tournament organised by UEFA, and the 9th season since it was renamed from the UEFA Cup to the UEFA Europa League.

The final was played at the Parc Olympique Lyonnais in Décines-Charpieu, France. Atlético Madrid defeated Marseille to win their third Europa League title.

As winners, Atlético Madrid earned the right to play against the winners of the 2017–18 UEFA Champions League, Real Madrid, in the 2018 UEFA Super Cup. Moreover, they would also have been automatically qualified for the 2018–19 UEFA Champions League group stage, but since they had already qualified through their league performance, the berth reserved was given to the third-placed team of the 2017–18 Ligue 1, the fifth-ranked association according to next season's access list.

Manchester United qualified for the 2017–18 UEFA Champions League as the title holders of Europa League. They were unable to defend their title as they qualified for the Champions League knockout phase, and were eliminated by Sevilla in the round of 16.

Association team allocation
A total of 190 teams from all 55 UEFA member associations participated in the 2017–18 UEFA Europa League. The association ranking based on the UEFA country coefficients was used to determine the number of participating teams for each association:
Associations 1–51 (except Liechtenstein) each had three teams qualify.
As the winners of the 2016–17 UEFA Europa League, Manchester United qualified for the 2017–18 UEFA Champions League; the 2017–18 UEFA Europa League berth they would otherwise have earned for finishing 6th in the 2016–17 Premier League was vacated and not passed to another English team.
Associations 52–54 each had two teams qualify.
Liechtenstein and Kosovo (association 55) each had one team qualify (Liechtenstein organised only a domestic cup and no domestic league; Kosovo as per decision by the UEFA Executive Committee).
Moreover, 33 teams eliminated from the 2017–18 UEFA Champions League were transferred to the Europa League.

Starting from this season, Gibraltar were granted two spots instead of one in the Europa League. Kosovo, who became a UEFA member on 3 May 2016, made their debut in the UEFA Europa League.

Association ranking
For the 2017–18 UEFA Europa League, the associations were allocated places according to their 2016 UEFA country coefficients, which took into account their performance in European competitions from 2011–12 to 2015–16.

Apart from the allocation based on the country coefficients, associations could have additional teams participating in the Europa League, as noted below:
 – Additional teams transferred from the UEFA Champions League
 – Vacated berth due to UEFA Europa League title holders playing in UEFA Champions League

Distribution
In the default access list, Manchester United entered the group stage (as the sixth-placed team of the 2016–17 Premier League). However, since they qualified for the Champions League as the Europa League title holders, the spot which they qualified for in the Europa League group stage was vacated, and the following changes to the default allocation system were made:
The domestic cup winners of association 13 (Czech Republic) are promoted from the third qualifying round to the group stage.
The domestic cup winners of association 18 (Poland) are promoted from the second qualifying round to the third qualifying round.
The domestic cup winners of associations 25 (Scotland) and 26 (Azerbaijan) are promoted from the first qualifying round to the second qualifying round.

Redistribution rules
A Europa League place was vacated when a team qualified for both the Champions League and the Europa League, or qualified for the Europa League by more than one method. When a place was vacated, it was redistributed within the national association by the following rules (regulations Articles 3.03 and 3.04):
When the domestic cup winners (considered as the "highest-placed" qualifier within the national association with the latest starting round) also qualified for the Champions League, their Europa League place was vacated. As a result, the highest-placed team in the league which had not yet qualified for European competitions qualified for the Europa League, with the Europa League qualifiers which finished above them in the league moving up one "place".
When the domestic cup winners also qualified for the Europa League through league position, their place through the league position was vacated. As a result, the highest-placed team in the league which had not yet qualified for European competitions qualified for the Europa League, with the Europa League qualifiers which finished above them in the league moving up one "place" if possible.
For associations where a Europa League place was reserved for either the League Cup or end-of-season European competition play-offs winners, they always qualified for the Europa League as the "lowest-placed" qualifier. If the League Cup winners had already qualified for European competitions through other methods, this reserved Europa League place was taken by the highest-placed team in the league which had not yet qualified for European competitions.

Teams
The labels in the parentheses show how each team qualified for the place of its starting round:
CW: Cup winners
2nd, 3rd, 4th, 5th, 6th, etc.: League position
LC: League Cup winners
RW: Regular season winners
PW: End-of-season European competition play-offs winners
UCL: Transferred from the Champions League
GS: Third-placed teams from the group stage
PO: Losers from the play-off round
Q3: Losers from the third qualifying round

Notably two teams took part in the competition that were not playing in their national top division, Tirana (2nd tier) and Vaduz (representing Liechtenstein, playing in Swiss second tier).

Notes

Round and draw dates
The schedule of the competition was as follows (all draws were held at the UEFA headquarters in Nyon, Switzerland, unless stated otherwise).

Matches in the qualifying, play-off, and knockout rounds could also be played on Tuesdays or Wednesdays instead of the regular Thursdays due to scheduling conflicts.

Qualifying rounds

In the qualifying rounds and the play-off round, teams are divided into seeded and unseeded teams based on their 2017 UEFA club coefficients, and then drawn into two-legged home-and-away ties. Teams from the same association cannot be drawn against each other.

First qualifying round

Second qualifying round

Third qualifying round

Play-off round

Group stage

The draw for the group stage was held on 25 August 2017, 13:00 CEST, at the Grimaldi Forum in Monaco. The 48 teams were drawn into twelve groups of four, with the restriction that teams from the same association cannot be drawn against each other. For the draw, the teams were seeded into four pots based on their 2017 UEFA club coefficients.

In each group, teams played against each other home-and-away in a round-robin format. The group winners and runners-up advanced to the round of 32, where they were joined by the eight third-placed teams of the 2017–18 UEFA Champions League group stage. The matchdays were 14 September, 28 September, 19 October, 2 November, 23 November, and 7 December 2017.

A total of 29 national associations were represented in the group stage. Arsenal, Atalanta, Fastav Zlín, 1899 Hoffenheim, İstanbul Başakşehir, 1. FC Köln, Lugano, Milan, Östersund, Real Sociedad, Red Star Belgrade, Vardar and Vitesse made their debut appearances in the UEFA Europa League group stage (although Milan and Red Star Belgrade had appeared in the UEFA Cup group stage). Vardar were the first team from Macedonia to play in either the Champions League or Europa League group stage.

Group A

Group B

Group C

Group D

Group E

Group F

Group G

Group H

Group I

Group J

Group K

Group L

Knockout phase

In the knockout phase, teams played against each other over two legs on a home-and-away basis, except for the one-match final. The mechanism of the draws for each round was as follows:
In the draw for the round of 32, the twelve group winners and the four third-placed teams from the Champions League group stage with the better group records were seeded, and the twelve group runners-up and the other four third-placed teams from the Champions League group stage were unseeded. The seeded teams were drawn against the unseeded teams, with the seeded teams hosting the second leg. Teams from the same group or the same association could not be drawn against each other.
In the draws for the round of 16 onwards, there were no seedings, and teams from the same group or the same association could be drawn against each other.

Bracket

Round of 32

Round of 16

Quarter-finals

Semi-finals

Final

Statistics
Statistics exclude qualifying rounds and play-off round.

Top goalscorers

Top assists

Squad of the season
The UEFA technical study group selected the following 18 players as the squad of the tournament.

Player of the season
Votes were cast by coaches of the 48 teams in the group stage, together with 55 journalists selected by the European Sports Media (ESM) group, representing each of UEFA's member associations. The coaches were not allowed to vote for players from their own teams. Jury members selected their top three players, with the first receiving five points, the second three and the third one. The shortlist of the top three players was announced on 9 August 2018. The award winner was announced during the 2018–19 UEFA Europa League group stage draw in Monaco on 31 August 2018.

See also
2017–18 UEFA Champions League
2018 UEFA Super Cup

References

External links

UEFA Europa League (official website)
UEFA Europa League history: 2017/18

 
2
2017-18